Yawan Airport  is a public use airport located in the Yawan District, Badakhshan, Afghanistan.

See also
List of airports in Afghanistan

References

External links 
 Airport record for Yawan Airport at Landings.com. Retrieved 2013-8-1

Airports in Afghanistan
Buildings and structures in Badakhshan Province